The Baker Public School is a pair of historic school buildings at 100 West Baker Street in Richmond, Virginia.  It consists of a small Colonial Revival brick building constructed in 1913 as an annex to an older (now demolished) building, and a larger 1939 Art Deco building built out of limestone and brick.  The latter is in an arrow shape, with its main entrance set at an angle facing the corner West Charity and St. Paul Streets.  The school served the African-American neighborhood of Jackson Ward (from which it is now separated by a highway) until 1979.

The school was listed on the National Register of Historic Places in 2016.

See also
National Register of Historic Places listings in Richmond, Virginia

References

National Register of Historic Places in Richmond, Virginia
Colonial Revival architecture in Virginia
School buildings completed in 1913
School buildings completed in 1939
Schools in Richmond, Virginia
School buildings on the National Register of Historic Places in Virginia
1913 establishments in Virginia